The Greatest Love World Tour is the debut worldwide concert tour by American singer Whitney Houston, in support of her debut studio album Whitney Houston. The four-month tour began in North America on July 26, 1986 at the Merriweather Post Pavilion with an itinerary that included visits in Europe, Japan and Australia.

Background

Houston's debut album was released in early 1985 and she performed at various clubs to promote the album. Following the success of the US #1 R&B hit single "You Give Good Love", Houston became the opening act for singers' Luther Vandross and Jeffrey Osborne on their individual 1985 US tours. After the next single, "Saving All My Love For You" became Houston's first #1 on the US Hot 100, she began headlining her own shows, playing at various American theaters, festivals, and clubs throughout the summer and fall of 1985. With more #1 hits on the way, and Houston's album at the top of the album charts, she would become a household name. She then embarked on her first worldwide tour, the successful The Greatest Love Tour. The tour started in North America during the summer of 1986, before heading to Europe, Japan, Australia and back to USA for a final show in Hawaii during the fall.

The show
The show consisted of Houston on a fringed round stage in the center of the arena/theater with a 9-piece band playing and four backup vocalists behind her. There were no costume changes or background dancers. Brother Gary Garland would replace Jermaine Jackson and Teddy Pendergrass on the duets. Comedian Sylvia Traymore served as the opening act.

While on her first global tour, Houston revealed she was a creative musician; rearranging most of the songs during her shows and sometimes deviating from the album's version. In "You Give Good Love", Houston would slow it down and emphasize the soulful elements of the song, treating it like a gospel number while breaking it down with her background singers. During "Saving All My Love", Houston arranged the song into a bluesy jazz number that recalled Billie Holiday. Houston often scatted with sax player Josh Harris during the end of the song. Many critics noted "He/I Believe" and "I Am Changing" as the show's highlights. The former is a song she learned from her mother which joins the gospel songs "He Is" with "I Believe". The latter is a cover of the show Jennifer Holliday's show stopping Dreamgirls song. After opening the show with a tease of the anthemic "Greatest Love of All", Houston closed out the show with a slowed down soulful version of the song.

Billboard magazine's Carlo Wolff said the following on his column for her show at Saratoga Performing Arts Center on July 28, 1986.

Opening acts
Sylvia Morrison from Washington, DC, is the first black female impressionist/comedian.

Sylvia Traymore Morrison   (USA—Leg)
Mark McCollum (comedian)  (USA—Leg)
Kenny G (USA—Leg, select dates)

Setlist
 "Instrumental Intro" (contains elements of "Also sprach Zarathustra" and excerpts from "Greatest Love of All")
 "Wanna Be Startin' Somethin'"
 "Eternal Love"
 "You Give Good Love"
 "Hold Me" (duet with Gary Houston)
 "How Will I Know"
 "Take Good Care of My Heart" (duet with Gary Houston)
 "Nobody Loves Me Like You Do" (duet with Gary Houston)
 "Saving All My Love for You"
 "Someone for Me"
 "I Am Changing"
 "Heart to Heart"
 "All at Once"
 "Didn't We Almost Have It All"
 "I Wanna Dance with Somebody (Who Loves Me)" 
 "He, I Believe"
 "Greatest Love of All"

Notes

Additional notes
July, August: for select dates, Whitney performed "Memories" , "A Brand New Day" and a duet with her mother, singer Cissy Houston.
Houston also added Kenny Loggins's US pop hit "Heart to Heart" and "I Am Changing" from the musical Dreamgirls as part of her set list for the tour.
August 4: at the Garden State Arts Center show, Whitney performed "When I First Saw You" with her mother Cissy and brother Gary. 
September 13: for the concert in Mountain View, Houston brought out a cake and sang "Happy Birthday" to her father, John Houston.
Houston was also working on her second album and included two new songs in her set, "I Wanna Dance With Somebody (Who Loves Me)" and "Didn't We Almost Have It All".

Shows

Cancellations and rescheduled shows

Personnel
Houston and John Simmons were friends from their church in New Jersey. While Houston was trying to get a recording contract, she would perform sets as part of her mother's nightclub act in New York City. Simmons was her musical director. Houston asked Simmons to put together a band that would back her during her nightclub act and record label showcases. The tour manager was Tony Bulluck, who remained her tour manager on several of her tours later, including the Nothing but Love Tour. Rickey Minor and Whitney's brother Gary Houston remained band members throughout her touring career.

Band
 Music Director / Piano – John Simmons
 Bass guitar / Bass synthesizer – Ricky Minor
 Guitar – Curtis Taylor Neishloss
 Keyboards – Willard Meeks
 Saxophone – Josh Harris
 Drums – Brian Brake
 Percussion – Kevin Jones
 Background vocalists – Gary Houston, Felicia Moss, Voneva Simms, Billy Baker
Tour Management
Manager – Tony Bulluck

Broadcast and recordings
 The show at Osaka-jō Hall on November 5 was broadcast live on Asahi Hōsō Radio in Japan. There were no official recordings released to the public.

Ticket price score data

External links
 the greatest love tour - whitneyhouston

References

1986 concert tours
Whitney Houston concert tours